Lac-Saguay is a village municipality in Antoine-Labelle Regional County Municipality in the Laurentides region of Quebec, Canada.

Its economy is centred on tourism, outdoor recreation, hunting, and fishing.

The municipality is named after the adjacent Lake Saguay, which in turn comes from the Algonquin sagwa, meaning "unblock" or "pour". An alternate explanation is that it comes from saki, meaning "river mouth."

History
In 1905, the first settlers arrived when Gouin Road opened that connected Nominingue to Ferme-Neuve via Lac-Saguay.

In 1911, the Township Municipality of Boyer-Partie-Ouest was formed out of previously unorganized area, named after Arthur Boyer. That same year, the Parish of Saint-Hugues-du-Lac-Saguay was founded.

In 1921, the post office opened under the name Lac-Saguay.

On July 1, 1951, Boyer-Partie-Ouest was dissolved and, together with more unorganized territory, reformed into the Township Municipality of Boyer. In 1963, it changed names and status to the Municipality of Saguay, and again in 1985 to the Village Municipality of Lac-Saguay.

Demographics 

Mother tongue:
 English as first language: 3.8%
 French as first language: 94.3%
 English and French as first language: 0%
 Other as first language: 1.9%

Local government

Lac-Saguay forms part of the federal electoral district of Laurentides—Labelle and has been represented by Marie-Hélène Gaudreau of the Bloc Québécois since 2019. Provincially, Lac-Saguay is part of the Labelle electoral district and is represented by Chantale Jeannotte of the Coalition Avenir Québec since 2018.

List of former mayors:
 Francine Asselin-Bélisle (...–2021)
 Michel Chouinard (2021–present)

See also
 List of village municipalities in Quebec

References

External links

Incorporated places in Laurentides
Villages in Quebec